Terry Broadhurst (born November 30, 1988 in Orland Park, Illinois) is an American professional ice hockey forward. He is currently playing with Augsburger Panther in the Deutsche Eishockey Liga (DEL).

Playing career
After a successful college playing career with the Nebraska–Omaha Mavericks, Broadhurst signed a two-year entry level deal with the Chicago Blackhawks of the National Hockey League (NHL) in 2012 and was assigned to the Rockford IceHogs. He split the following season between the IceHogs in the AHL and the Toledo Walleye in the ECHL. In 2013, he was joined by his younger brother Alex Broadhurst on the IceHogs.

After spending two full seasons with the IceHogs, Broadhurst left the Blackhawks organization as a free agent to sign a one-year AHL deal with the Chicago Wolves on July 30, 2014.

On July 10, 2015, Broadhurst signed his first contract abroad, agreeing to a one-year contract with Swedish club, Skellefteå AIK, of the Swedish Hockey League (SHL). He left Skellefteå in February 2016 and moved to fellow SHL side Brynäs IF where he played for the remainder of the season.

On May 18, 2016, he penned a deal with KooKoo of the Finnish top-flight Liiga. In the 2016–17 season, Broadhurst quickly adapted to the Finnish level securing a scoring line role in producing 14 goals and 36 points in 53 games.

As a free agent over the summer, Broadhurst opted to return to the AHL during the 2017–18 season, re-uniting with brother Alex in agreeing to a professional try-out deal with the Cleveland Monsters on October 30, 2017. Rediscovering his offensive touch, Broadhurst remained on the Monsters for the duration of the season, placing fourth in team scoring with 32 points in 49 games.

On August 8, 2018, Broadhurst returned to his original AHL club as a free agent, signing a one-year contract with the Rockford IceHogs. In 40 games with the IceHogs, Broadhurst added 4 goals and 12 points.

As a free agent entering the 2019–20 season, Broadhurst marked his 31st birthday by agreeing to a professional tryout contract with reigning AHL champions, the Charlotte Checkers, on November 30, 2019. After adding 4 assists in 23 games over the course of his tryout, Broadhurst was signed to an AHL contract for the remainder of the season with the Checkers on February 18, 2020. Broadhurst made just 6 more appearances before he was traded by the Checkers, along with Cedric Lacroix to the Bridgeport Sound Tigers in exchange for Ryan Bourque on March 2, 2020.

Broadhurst remained a free agent into the pandemic delayed 2020-21 season, only to belatedly sign with the Indy Fuel of the ECHL on April 8, 2021. He made 21 regular season appearances, providing a scoring presence with 6 goals and 19 points.

After a lone season with the Tucson Roadrunners in the 2021–22 season, Broadhurst returned to Europe and signed a one-year deal with German club, Augsburger Panther of the DEL, on September 9, 2022.

Career statistics

Awards and honors

References

External links

1988 births
American men's ice hockey left wingers
Augsburger Panther players
Bridgeport Sound Tigers players
Brynäs IF players
Charlotte Checkers (2010–) players
Chicago Wolves players
Cleveland Monsters players
Ice hockey players from Illinois
Indy Fuel players
KooKoo players
Living people
Omaha Mavericks men's ice hockey players
Rockford IceHogs (AHL) players
Sioux Falls Stampede players
Skellefteå AIK players
Toledo Walleye players
Tucson Roadrunners players